Charles Maurin (1 April 1856 – 22 July 1914) was a French painter and engraver in a variety of styles.

Life and career

Maurin was born in Le Puy-en-Velay (Haute-Loire, Auvergne-Rhône-Alpes). He was awarded the Prix Crozatier in 1875, and used the funds to go to Paris to study art at the Ecole des Beaux-Arts under Jules Lefebvre from 1876 to 1879. He also studied at the Académie Julian, where he eventually taught. He exhibited at the Salon of French artists and became a member of the Society of French Artists in 1883. He was a teacher and friend of the painter Félix Vallotton. Deeply anti-clerical, he was a great admirer of Jules Vallès, Kropotkin, Louise Michel, and Flora Tristan.

Art

Maurin received the support of Vollard and was a friend of Toulouse-Lautrecwho had his first individual exhibition with him in 1893and also of many other artists, including François-Rupert Carabin and the entertainer Aristide Bruant. A notable symbolist work of his is Maternity, a study of motherhood. Inspired by Japanese artists, he revolutionized the technique of etching, but without forgetting the woodcuts. In 1891 he patented a method of color printing. In 1892, he exhibited at the Salon de la Rose + Croix. He contributed to La Revue Blanche, directed by Félix Fénéon, and Les Temps nouveaux, published by Jean Grave.

In 1893 Maurin produced a commemorative woodcut of the anarchist Ravachol, depicting him in front of the guillotine against a rising sun and a field of grain. The art historian Howard G. Lay has commented on the piece's "japoniste perspective" and "robust linearity", its "schematization of form" and "stylistic overtures to artless sincerity", which he argues lend the picture an "iconic bearing" and its subject a "saintly stature".

Charles Maurin died on 22 July 1914 in Grasse (Provence, Aquitaine).

References

External links

19th-century French painters
French male painters
20th-century French painters
20th-century French male artists
1856 births
1914 deaths
Académie Julian alumni
People from Le Puy-en-Velay
19th-century French male artists

French anarchists